Elbow Pond is a  pond in the Cedarville section of Plymouth, Massachusetts. The pond is located south of Island Pond and west of Great Herring Pond.

External links
Environmental Protection Agency
South Shore Coastal Watersheds - Lake Assessments

Ponds of Plymouth, Massachusetts
Ponds of Massachusetts